Fedelm, Gaelic-Irish female given name.

Fedelm was a name that, like Flann, could be used by both sexes. It has been rendered Fedelm, Fedlimid, Fedlim.

For male bearers of the name, see Fedlim.

Bearers of the name

 Fedelm, prophet and fili, in the Ulster Cycle of Irish mythology.
 Fedelm Noíchrothach
 Fedhelm ingen Domhnaill, Abbess of Cluana Brónaigh, died 931.

External links
 http://medievalscotland.org/kmo/AnnalsIndex/Feminine/Fedelm.shtml

Irish-language feminine given names